The Rondônia gubernatorial election was held on 5 October 2014 to elect the next governor of the state of Rondônia.  If no candidate receives more than 50% of the vote, a second-round runoff election will be held on 26 October.  Governor Confúcio Moura is running for a second term. Confúcio Moura won the election.

Results 
First Round:

Second Round:

Candidates
Padre Ton 13 (PT) - Federal Deputy (elected in 2010); former Mayor of Alto Alegre dos Parecis (elected in 2004, 2008)
Fatinha 13 (PT) - City Councillor, Porto Velho
Confúcio Moura 15 (PMDB) - Governor of Rondônia (elected in 2010); former Mayor of Ariquemes (2004-2010)
Daniel Pereira 15 (PSB) - lawyer, former State Deputy
Jaqueline Cassol 22 (PR) - Rondônia Director-General of Traffic & Secretary of State for Strategic Assets (2003-2010)
Carlos Magno 22 (PP) - Federal Deputy (elected in 2010)
Expedito Júnior 45 (PSDB) - former Senator (2007-2009) and former Federal Deputy
Neodi Carlos 45 (PSDB) - State Deputy (elected in 2006, 2010)
Pimenta de Rondonia 50 (PSOL) - merchant
Professora Régia 50 (PSOL) - secondary school teacher

References

2014 Brazilian gubernatorial elections
Rondônia gubernatorial elections
October 2014 events in South America